An enterostomy (entero- + -stomy) is either (1) a surgical procedure to create a durable opening (called a stoma) through the abdominal wall into an intestine (small intestine or large intestine) or (2) the stoma thus created. The various types of enterostomy are named according to which intestinal segment is involved.

Indications for surgery and complications are dependent on the site of the enterostomy.

Gastrostomies and enterostomies can be used to provide nutrition in digestive disorders.

Hernia development at both permanent and temporary enterostomy sites in a common complication.

See also
 Gastrostomy

References 

Medical procedures